The Payer Mountains is a group of scattered mountains extending north-south for about , standing  east of the Weyprecht Mountains and forming the eastern half of the Hoel Mountains in central Queen Maud Land. 

They were discovered by the Third German Antarctic Expedition (1938–1939), led by Capt. Alfred Ritscher, and named for Julius Payer, Austrian polar explorer, who in company with Karl Weyprecht discovered Franz Josef Land in 1873.

See also
 List of mountains of Queen Maud Land
 Veterok Rock

References

External links
 United States Geological Survey, Geographic Names Information System (GNIS)
 Scientific Committee on Antarctic Research (SCAR)

Mountain ranges of Queen Maud Land
Princess Astrid Coast